Jacek Sawaszkiewicz (September 10, 1947 – June 11, 1999) was a Polish science fiction writer, satirist, also a contributor to satirical magazine Karuzela and Polish radio broadcast Polskie Radio Szczecin.

He made his debut with a story Sanatorium (Karuzela 1972). His book debut was Czekając (1978). Most known for his social science fiction Kronika Akaszy series.

Collections
(1978) Czekając (Wydawnictwo Poznańskie)
(1978) Mój tatko (Iskry)
(1979) Przybysz; Wyznanie; Potestas (Nasza Księgarnia)
(1980)  Admirał Douglas Westrex; Kariera Johna Stoffhansenna; Cerebrak; Manekin (Nasza Księgarnia)
(1983) Mistyfikacje; Raport; Guzik ; Pożegnanie; Życie rodzinne; Prawda (Nasza Księgarnia)
(1983) Tatko i ja (Krajowa Agencja Wydawnicza)
(1985) Z moim tatkiem ([opowiadania satyryczne] Krajowa Agencja Wydawnicza)
(1985) Między innymi makabra (Glob)
(1986) Wahadło (Glob)
(1988) Mój tatko i cała reszta (Krajowa Agencja Wydawnicza)

Novels
(1979) Sukcesorzy (Wydawnictwo Poznańskie)
(1980) Katharsis (Iskry)
(1982) Eskapizm (Wydawnictwo Poznańskie)
(1981) Kronika Akaszy. Inicjacja (Wydawnictwo Poznańskie)
(1982) Kronika Akaszy. Skorupa astralna (Wydawnictwo Poznańskie)
(1984) Kronika Akaszy. Metempsychoza (Wydawnictwo Poznańskie)
(1986) Kronika Akaszy. Powtórka z Apokalipsy (Wydawnictwo Poznańskie)
(1986) Stan zagrożenia (Wydawnictwo Poznańskie)
(1988) Na tle kosmicznej otchłani (Krajowa Agencja Wydawnicza)

Bibliography
 Leksykon polskiej literatury fantastycznonaukowej - Andrzej Niewiadowski, Antoni Smuszkiewicz, Wydawnictwo Poznańskie, Poznań 1990, 
 Polish Literary Bibliography

See also
Polish literature
Polish writers

Polish science fiction writers
1947 births
1999 deaths